The Diocese of Korčula (also Diocese of Curzola or Diocese of Cursola) was a Roman Catholic diocese in Croatia, located in the city of Korčula. In 1828, it was suppressed to the Archdiocese of Dubrovnik.

History
1300: Established (from the Diocese of Hvar and from the suppressed Diocese of Ston as Diocese of Korčula  (Dioecesis Curzolensis) 
1541: Lost territory to establish Diocese of Ston 
June 30, 1828: Suppressed to the Diocese of Dubrovnik via the papal bull, Locum Beati Petri, issued by Pope Leo XII on 30 June 1828.
1933: Restored as Titular Episcopal See of Korčula

Ordinaries

Diocese of Korčula 

Agostino Quinzio, O.P. (17 Jun 1573 – 17 Aug 1605 Appointed, Bishop of Massa Lubrense)
Raphael Riva (Ripa), O.P. (12 Sep 1605 – 24 Nov 1610 Appointed, Bishop of Chioggia)
Theodorus Dedo, O.P. (14 Mar 1611 – Aug 1625 Died) 
Giacomo Fagagna (Faganeo), O.S.H. (28 Jan 1626 – Aug 1642 Died) 
Francesco Manola (12 Jan 1643 – Aug 1664 Died) 
Gerolamo de Andreis (13 Apr 1665 – 2 Feb 1673 Died) 
Nikola Spanic (17 Jul 1673 – 29 Nov 1707 Died) 
Marino Drago  (3 Oct 1708 – 9 Oct 1733 Died) 
Vincent Cossovich  (1 Dec 1734 – 21 Jul 1761 Died) 
Michael Triali (23 Nov 1761 – 23 Sep 1771 Appointed, Archbishop of Zadar) 
Giovanni Carsana (23 Sep 1771 – 6 Jun 1774 Appointed, Archbishop of Zadar) 
Simon Spalatin (13 Mar 1775 – 25 Jun 1781 Appointed, Bishop of Ossero) 
Antun Belglava  (17 Sep 1781 – 28 Sep 1787 Appointed, Bishop of Trogir) 
Josephus Cosserich Teodosio  (28 Sep 1787 – Feb 1802 Died)

See also
Catholic Church in Croatia

References

Roman Catholic dioceses in Croatia
History of Dalmatia